Cüneyt Erden (born 5 September 1977) is a Turkish professional basketball coach and former player who played at the point guard position.

External links
TBLStat.net Profile

1977 births
Living people
Anadolu Efes S.K. players
Beşiktaş men's basketball players
Darüşşafaka Basketbol players
Galatasaray S.K. (men's basketball) players
Karşıyaka basketball players
Kepez Belediyesi S.K. players
Point guards
Sportspeople from Bursa
Tofaş S.K. players
Turkish men's basketball players
Türk Telekom B.K. players
Ülker G.S.K. basketball players